Parfait Bizoza (born 3 March 1999) is a Norwegian professional footballer who plays for Danish Superliga club Lyngby Boldklub.

Club career
Bizoza was born in a refugee camp, and came to Norway at the age of 4. 

Growing up in Skodje, he started playing for IL Ravn as a child. He was a junior player for Aalesunds FK from 2015 to 2017, leaving to pursue a senior career in local SK Herd. He was picked up by newly promoted second-tier club Raufoss IL in 2019, and after impressing there he was deemed good enough for Aalesund. He made his debut for Aalesund in July 2020 against Mjøndalen.

On 19 February 2021, he signed a 3.5-year contract with Russian Premier League club FC Ufa. He made his league debut for FC Ufa on 7 March 2021 in the away game against FC Ural Yekaterinburg, where he was sent-off just 14 minutes after start.

On 28 August 2021, Ufa announced his transfer to Vendsyssel FF in Denmark. On transfer deadline day, 31 January 2023, Bizoza joined Danish Superliga club Lyngby Boldklub on a deal until June 2025.

International career
In late 2019, Bizoza, while a Norwegian citizen, was also called up to the Burundi national football team.

References

External links

1999 births
Living people
People from Skodje
Burundian emigrants to Norway
Norwegian footballers
Burundian footballers
Norwegian expatriate footballers
Burundian expatriate footballers
Association football midfielders
Raufoss IL players
Aalesunds FK players
FC Ufa players
Vendsyssel FF players
Lyngby Boldklub players
Norwegian First Division players
Eliteserien players
Russian Premier League players
Norwegian expatriate sportspeople in Russia
Norwegian expatriate sportspeople in Denmark
Expatriate footballers in Russia
Expatriate men's footballers in Denmark
Sportspeople from Møre og Romsdal